Afroedura rupestris, also known as the Abel Erasmus flat gecko, is a species of African gecko, first found in the Limpopo and Mpumalanga provinces of South Africa.

References

Further reading
Perera, Sandun J., Dayani Ratnayake-Perera, and Serban Proches. "Vertebrate distributions indicate a greater Maputaland-Pondoland-Albany region of endemism." South African Journal of Science 107.7-8 (2011): 52–66.

External links
Reptile database entry

Afroedura
Reptiles described in 2014
Endemic reptiles of South Africa